Jasmina Stojanoska (born 10 July 1987) is a Macedonian footballer who plays as a defender. She has been a member of the North Macedonia women's national team.

References

1987 births
Living people
Women's association football defenders
Macedonian women's footballers
North Macedonia women's international footballers